Åsa Domeij (born 29 April 1962, in Örnsköldsvik), is a Swedish Green Party politician and an agronomist by training. She was a member of the Riksdag from 1988 until 1991 and then again from 2002 until 2006.

External links
Åsa Domeij at the Riksdag website

1962 births
21st-century Swedish women politicians
Living people
Members of the Riksdag 1988–1991
Members of the Riksdag 2002–2006
Members of the Riksdag from the Green Party
People from Örnsköldsvik Municipality
Women members of the Riksdag